The University of Houston (UH) is a public research university in Houston, Texas. Founded in 1927, UH is a member of the University of Houston System and the  university in Texas with over 47,000 students. Its campus, which is primarily in southeast Houston, spans , with the inclusion of its Sugar Land and Katy sites. The university is classified as an "R1: Doctoral Universities – Very high research activity."

The university offers more than 276 degree programs through its 16
academic colleges and schools and an interdisciplinary Honors College, including programs leading to professional degrees in architecture, law, optometry, medicine and pharmacy. The institution spends $203 million annually in research, and operates more than 35 research centers and institutes on campus. Interdisciplinary research includes superconductivity, space commercialization and exploration, biomedical sciences and engineering, energy and natural resources, and artificial intelligence. Awarding nearly 11,000 degrees annually, UH's alumni base exceeds 300,000. The economic impact of the university contributes over $6.4 billion annually to the Texas economy, while generating about 62,000 jobs. The Shell Energy Transition Institute was created in 2022, with a $10 million gift from Shell. In 2020, the university launched its College of Medicine to improve the overall health and health care resources of its city and state. In 2022, the College of Medicine received a $50 million donation from entrepreneur and University of Houston System Chairman, Tilman Fertitta, and was renamed the Tilman J. Fertitta Family College of Medicine.

The University of Houston hosts a variety of theatrical performances, concerts, lectures, and events. It has more than 500 student organizations and 17 intercollegiate sports teams. Annual UH events and traditions include The Cat's Back, Homecoming, and Frontier Fiesta. The university's varsity athletic teams, known as the Houston Cougars, are members of the American Athletic Conference and compete in the NCAA Division I in all sports. In 2021, the university received and accepted an invitation to join the Big 12 Conference. The football team regularly makes bowl game appearances, and the men's basketball team has made 23 appearances in the NCAA Division I Tournament—including six Elite Eight and Final Four appearances. The men's golf team has won 16 national championships—the most in NCAA history. In 2022, UH's men's track and field team earned its seventh Indoor Conference Championship title, and its swimming and diving team defended its American Athletic Conference title for the sixth straight season.

History

Founding
The University of Houston began as Houston Junior College (HJC). On March 7, 1927, trustees of the Board of Education of the Houston Independent School District (HISD) unanimously signed a charter founding the junior college. The junior college was operated and administered by HISD.

HJC was originally located on the San Jacinto High School campus and offered only night courses to train future teachers.

Its first class began June 5, 1927, with an enrollment of 232 students and 12 faculty recruited from Rice University, the University of Texas and Sam Houston State Teacher's College. The first session accepted no freshman students, and its purpose was to mainly educate future teachers about the college. In the fall semester, HJC opened enrolled to high school students. By then, the college had 230 students and eight faculty members holding evening classes at San Jacinto High School and day classes in area churches.
 
HJC's first president was Edison Ellsworth Oberholtzer, who was the dominant force in establishing the junior college.

University beginnings
The junior college became eligible to become a university in October 1933 when the governor of Texas, Miriam A. Ferguson, signed House Bill 194 into law. On September 11, 1933, Houston's Board of Education adopted a resolution to make HJC a four-year institution and changing its name to the University of Houston. Unanimously approved by the board, the formal charter of UH was passed April 30, 1934.

UH's first session as a four-year institution began June 4, 1934, at San Jacinto High School with an enrollment of 682. By the fall semester it had 909 students enrolled in classes taught by 39 faculty members in three colleges and schools - College of Arts and Sciences, College of Community Service and General College. In 1934, the first campus of the University of Houston was established at the Second Baptist Church at Milam and McGowen. The next fall, the campus was moved to the South Main Baptist Church on Main Street—between Richmond Avenue and Eagle Street—where it stayed for the next five years. In May 1935, the institution as a university held its first commencement at Miller Outdoor Theatre.

In the mission of finding UH a permanent home, heirs of philanthropists J. J. Settegast and Ben Taub donated  to the university for use as a permanent location in 1936. At this time, there was no road that led to the land tract, but in 1937, the city added Saint Bernard Street, which was later renamed to Cullen Boulevard. It would become a major thoroughfare of the campus. As a project of the National Youth Administration, workers were paid fifty cents an hour to clear the land. In 1938, Hugh Roy Cullen donated $335,000 for the first building to be built at the location. The Roy Gustav Cullen Memorial Building was dedicated on June 4, 1939, and opened for classes officially on Wednesday, September 20, 1939. The building was the first air-conditioned college building constructed on a U.S. campus.
A year after opening the new campus, the university had over 2,000 students. As World War II approached, enrollment decreased due to the draft and enlistments. The university was one of six colleges selected to train radio technicians in the V-12 Navy College Training Program. By the fall of 1943, there were only about 1,100 regular students at UH; thus, the 300 or so servicemen contributed in sustaining the faculty and facilities of the Engineering College. This training at UH continued until March 1945, with a total of 4,178 students.

On March 12, 1945, Senate Bill 207 was signed into law, removing the control of the University of Houston from HISD and placing it into the hands of a board of regents. In 1945, the university—which had grown too large and complex for the Houston school board to administer—became a private university. 

In March 1947, the regents authorized creation of a law school at the university. In 1949, the M.D. Anderson Foundation made a $1.5 million gift to UH for the construction of a dedicated library building on the campus. By 1950, the educational plant at UH consisted of 12 permanent buildings. Enrollment was more than 14,000 with a full-time faculty of more than 300. KUHF, the university radio station, signed on in November. By 1951, UH had achieved the feat of being the second-largest university in the state of Texas.

State university

In 1953, the university established KUHT—the first educational television station in the nation—after the four yearlong Federal Communications Commission's television licensing freeze ended. During this period, however, the university as a private institution was facing financial troubles. Tuition failed to cover rising costs, and in turn, tuition increases caused a drop in enrollment. That's when it was proposed that UH become a state-funded university.

After a lengthy battle between supporters of the University of Houston, led by school president A.D. Bruce, and forces from state universities, including the University of Texas, geared to block the change, Senate Bill 2 was passed on May 23, 1961, enabling the university to enter the state system in 1963.

The University of Houston, initially reserved for white and non-black students, was racially desegregated circa the 1960s as part of the civil rights movements. A group of students called  Afro-Americans for Black Liberation (AABL) advocated for desegregation in that period. Robinson Block, a UH undergraduate student writing for Houston History Magazine, stated that as local businesses and student organization remained segregated by race, the first group of black students "had a hard time".

As the University of Houston celebrated its 50th anniversary, the Texas Legislature formally established the University of Houston System in 1977. Philip G. Hoffman resigned from his position as president of UH and became the first chancellor of the University of Houston System. The University of Houston became the oldest and largest member institution in the UH System with nearly 30,000 students.

On April 26, 1983, the university appended its official name to University of Houston–University Park; however, the name was changed back to University of Houston on August 26, 1991. This name change was an effort by the UH System to give its flagship institution a distinctive name that would eliminate confusion with the University of Houston–Downtown (UHD), which is a separate and distinct degree-granting institution that is not part of the University of Houston.

Restructuring and growth

In 1997, the administrations of the UH System and the University of Houston were combined under a single chief executive officer, with the dual title of chancellor of the UH System and president of the University of Houston. Arthur K. Smith became the first person to hold the combined position. Since 1997, the University of Houston System Administration has been located on campus in the Ezekiel W. Cullen Building.

On October 15, 2007, Renu Khator was selected for the position of UH System chancellor and UH president. On November 5, 2007, Khator was confirmed as the third person to hold the dual title of UH System chancellor and UH president concurrently, and took office in January 2008.

In January 2011, the University of Houston was classified by the Carnegie Foundation for the Advancement of Teaching as a research university with very high research activity.

Campus

UH is in southeast Houston, with an official address of 4800 Calhoun Road. The campus spans  and is roughly bisected by Cullen Boulevard—a thoroughfare that has become synonymous with the university. The Third Ward Redevelopment Council defines the University of Houston as being part of the Third Ward. Melissa Correa of KHOU also stated that the university is in the Third Ward.

The university campus includes numerous green spaces, fountains and sculptures, including a work by famed sculptor Jim Sanborn. Renowned architects César Pelli and Philip Johnson have designed buildings on the UH campus. Recent campus beautification projects have garnered awards from the Keep Houston Beautiful group for improvements made to the Cullen Boulevard corridor.

UH is the flagship institution of the University of Houston System (UH System). It has additional instructional sites located in Sugar Land and Katy.

Campus layout

The University of Houston's campus framework has identified the following five core districts: the Central District, the Arts District, the Professional District, the Residential District, and the Athletics District. In addition, the campus contains several outlying areas not identified among the five districts.

The Central Distinct contains the academic core of the university and consists of the M.D. Anderson Library, the College of Liberal Arts and Social Sciences, the College of Natural Sciences and Mathematics, the College of Technology and the Honors College. The interior of the campus has the original buildings: the Roy G. Cullen Building, the Old Science Building, and the Ezekiel W. Cullen Building. Academic and research facilities include the Cullen Performance Hall, the Science and Engineering Research and Classroom Complex, and Texas Center for Superconductivity and various other science and liberal arts buildings. This area of campus features the reflecting pool at Cullen Family Plaza, the Lynn Eusan Park, and various plazas and green spaces.

The Arts District is located in the northern part of campus and is home to the university's School of Art, the Moores School of Music, the School of Theatre and Dance, the Gerald D. Hines College of Architecture and Design, and the Jack J. Valenti School of Communication. The district also has the Cynthia Woods Mitchell Center for the Performing Arts which houses the Lyndall Finley Wortham Theatre, the main stage of the School of Theatre and Dance, and Moores Opera Center. Other facilities include the Dudley Recital Hall and the Organ Recital Hall in the Fine Arts Building, the Quintero Theatre in the School of Theatre and Dance, and the Moores Opera House and Choral Recital Hall in the Moores School of Music Building.

The Professional District is located northeast and east of the university campus. The district has facilities of the University of Houston Law Center, the Cullen College of Engineering and the C.T. Bauer College of Business. This area of campus is home to Calhoun Lofts, which is an upper-level and graduate housing facility. The East Parking Garage is located on the east end of the district. Adjacent to the district is the University Center (UC), the larger of two student unions on campus.

The Residential District is in the southern portion of the campus, along Wheeler Avenue and east of Martin Luther King Boulevard. This area has undergraduate dormitories, the Conrad N. Hilton College of Hotel and Restaurant Management, now Conrad N. Hilton College of Global Hospitality Leadership, and the College of Optometry. Dormitory facilities include the twin 18-story Moody Towers, Cougar Village, University Lofts, Cougar Place, and the recently demolished Quadrangle which had the following five separate halls: Oberholtzer, Bates, Taub, Settegast, and Law. The Quadrangle was rebuilt in 2020 and renamed The Quad, admitting sophomore level students and up. Adjacent to the Moody Towers and Lynn Eusan Park is the Hilton University of Houston Hotel.

The Athletics District covers the northwest and west part of campus. It includes athletic training facilities for UH sport teams and its stadiums. The western part of the district is home to TDECU Stadium, the football indoor practice facility and the Stadium Parking Garage. Across the parking garage, in the northwestern portion of the district, is the Hofheinz Pavilion. In 2018, the stadium was rebuilt and renamed to the Fertitta Center after UH received a $20 million donation from entrepreneur and UH System Board of Regents Chairman Tilman Fertitta. Facilities surrounding the stadium are Carl Lewis International Track & Field Complex, Cougar Field, Softball Stadium, the Alumni Center and the Athletic Center.

Facilities

Much of the physical property was originally developed in 1953 by the oilfield services company Schlumberger as its global headquarters. It was acquired by the university in 2009.

The University of Houston Libraries is the library system of the university. It consists of the M.D. Anderson Library and three branch libraries: the Music Library, William R. Jenkins Architecture, Design & Art Library and the Health Sciences Library. In addition to the libraries administered by the UH Libraries, the university also has the O'Quinn Law Library and the Conrad N. Hilton Library.

The Cullen Performance Hall is a 1,612 seat proscenium theater which offers a variety of events sponsored by departments and organizations at the university in addition to contemporary music concerts, opera, modern dance, and theatrical performances put on by groups in and outside the Houston area. The Blaffer Art Museum, a contemporary art museum, exhibits the works of both international artists and those of students in the university's School of Art.

The  Campus Recreation and Wellness Center, which is home to the nation's largest collegiate natatorium, was recognized by the National Intramural-Sports Association as an outstanding facility upon its completion in 2004.

The LeRoy and Lucile Melcher Center for Public Broadcasting houses the studios and offices of KUHT Houston PBS, the nation's first public television station; KUHF (88.7 FM), Houston's NPR station; the Center for Public Policy Polling; and television studio labs.

The  Science and Engineering Complex (SEC) was designed by architect César Pelli's firm, Pelli, Clarke & Partners. It houses facilities for many interdisciplinary research programs at UH, including bionanotechnology.

The university has an on-campus Hilton hotel that is part of the Conrad N. Hilton College of Global Hospitality Leadership. This hotel was established with a donation by the founder of Hilton Hotels, Conrad N. Hilton, and is staffed by students in the College of Global Hospitality Leadership

The University of Houston operates a  branch campus in Sugar Land. The campus was founded in 1995 as a higher education "teaching center" of the University of Houston System. The branch campus has three buildings for exclusive use by the university: the Albert and Mamie George Building, Brazos Hall, and the College of Technology building. Additionally, the University Branch of the Fort Bend County Libraries system is located on the campus for use by students and the Sugar Land community.

Institutional structure

Governance
UH is the flagship institution of the UH System. It is a multi-campus university with a branch campus located in Sugar Land. The University of Houston–Clear Lake (UHCL), the University of Houston–Downtown (UHD), and the University of Houston–Victoria (UHV) are stand-alone universities; they are not branch campuses of UH.

The organization and control of the UH is vested in the UH System Board of Regents. The board consists of nine members who are appointed by the governor for a six-year term and has all the rights, powers and duties that it has with respect to the organization and control of other institutions in the System; however, UH is maintained as a separate and distinct institution.

Administration

The president is the chief executive officer (CEO) of the University of Houston, and serves concurrently as chancellor of the UH System. The position is appointed by its board of regents. As of January 2008, Renu Khator has been president of the University of Houston and chancellor of the UH System.

The administrations of UH and the UH System are located on the university campus in the Ezekiel W. Cullen Building. From 1961 until 1977, the Weingarten House in Riverside Terrace housed the president of UH. Currently, the chancellor/president resides in the Wortham House in Broadacres Historic District, provided by the UH System Board of Regents as part of the chancellor/president's employment contract.

Academics

The university offers over 276 degree programs. With final approval of a Ph.D. in Communication Sciences and Disorders, a Doctorate in Nursing Practice, and a Doctorate in Medicine, university offers 51 doctoral degrees including three professional doctorate degrees in law, optometry, medicine and pharmacy.

In 2022, UH System Board of Regents unanimously approved  the addition of a new degree program of the Bachelor of Arts in Mexican American and Latino/a Applied Studies.  Being located in a city with a large Hispanic/Latino population, the degree aims to focus on the experiences and contributions of the Latino community in the United States.

Awarding more than 9,000 degrees annually, UH's alumni base exceeds 260,000 and is the largest in the Houston area.

UH is one of four public universities in Texas with a Phi Beta Kappa chapter. The University of Houston's faculty includes National Medal of Science recipient Paul Chu from the Physics Department, and Nobel Peace Prize Laureate Jody Williams.

The College of Liberal Arts and Social Sciences (CLASS) has the Creative Writing Program which includes founders such as alumnus Donald Barthelme and offers degrees in poetry, fiction, and non-fiction. The Gerald D. Hines College of Architecture and Design is one of only 36 schools to have an accreditation from the National Architectural Accrediting Board.

In August 2016, the Texas Higher Education Coordinating Board approved the creation of the Hobby School of Public Affairs. The school, named in honor of former Texas Lt. Gov. Bill Hobby, builds on the existing educational and research programs of the Center for Public Policy, which was founded at UH in 1981. The designation officially moves the Master of Public Policy Degree from the UH College of Liberal Arts and Social Sciences to the Hobby School of Public Affairs and approves the addition of a Master of Public Policy degree as a dual degree with the Graduate College of Social Work's Master of Social Work.

In October 2018, the Texas Higher Education Coordinating Board approved the creation of the College of Medicine. A site has been selected for the college's new building, and the inaugural class entered in 2020.

Rankings

UH was ranked in the top 50 college for Social Mobility in U.S. News & World Report's Best Colleges Rankings.  The Princeton Review has listed UH as one of America's best colleges. The institution is among the Top 300 in the global Academic Ranking of World Universities.

The University of Houston Law Center was ranked 58th among the nation's "Best Law Schools" in U.S. News & World Report, 5th in the state of Texas and 58th in the nation in 2023. 
U.S. News & World Report ranked the C.T. Bauer College of Business as the top Undergraduate Business Program in Houston, 5th among public universities in the state of Texas. The Conrad N. Hilton College of Global Hospitality Leadership ranked 8th in the nation for its Hospitality & Leisure Management program and 19th for Hospitality and Tourism Management.   The University of Houston Graduate School of Social Work ranked 28th nationally by the U.S. News & World Report 2022 Best Schools for Social Work ranking. The Wolff Center for Entrepreneurship at the C.T. Bauer College of Business undergraduate program for Entrepreneurship consistently ranks in the top 10 in the nation. The Princeton Review and Entrepreneur magazine  ranked the program No. 1 in 2019, 2020 and 2021.

Research

The Carnegie Foundation classifies UH as a doctoral degree-granting institution with "highest research activity." The designation recognizes it as one of only nine universities in Texas with the classification.

According to the National Science Foundation, UH spent $177 million on research and development in 2018, ranking it 123rd in the nation. It operates more than 40 research centers and institutes on campus, and through these facilities, UH maintains partnerships with government, health care and private industry. Areas of interdisciplinary research include nanotechnology, superconductivity, space commercialization and exploration, biomedical sciences and engineering, energy and natural resources, and artificial intelligence.

The university has five institutional research thrusts to address several research challenges aimed at economic development and improving the quality of life. The five thrusts include: Cyber and Physical Security, Drug Discovery and Development, Sustainable Communities and Infrastructure, Energy Security and Transition, and Accessible Health Care.

In 2018, UH launched its 50in5 initiative. Led by the Provost Paula Short and Vice President for Research Amr Elnashai, the university is working to increase research by 50 percent in five years. This includes the doubling of UH's national centers from five to 10, thereby improving its position for the Association of American University's membership.

In 2022, UH received $4 million for the expansion of its Center of Economic Inclusion.

Student life

The University of Houston is notable for its diverse student body, and U.S. News & World Report ranks the university as the second-most ethnically diverse research university in the United States. UH's Asian and Hispanic student population is among the highest in the state.  Due to the high percentage of Hispanic students on campus, UH has been deemed a Hispanic-serving institution. Its international student population is primarily from Asia.

Art, music and theatre

Located in the Fine Arts Building, Blaffer Art Museum is a contemporary art museum dedicated to emerging, mid-career, and underrepresented artists and bodies of work through exhibitions, publications, and public programs. Its educational programs include public lectures, artists' talks, docent tours, audio guides, and youth programs such as Studio Saturday, Summer Arts, and the Young Artist Apprenticeship Program.

The Cullen Performance Hall is a 1,612 seat proscenium theater located near Entrance 1. The hall offers a variety of events sponsored by departments and organizations at the university in addition to contemporary music concerts, opera, modern dance, and theatrical performances put on by groups in and outside the Houston area.

The Rebecca and John J. Moores School of Music presents concerts in various campus venues: Dudley Recital Hall and the Organ Recital Hall in the Fine Arts Building, and in the Moores Opera House and Choral Recital Hall in the music building. Musical events range from opera to jazz with performers including students, faculty, and guest artists.

The School of Theatre and Dance offers a subscription series of five plays each year. Works by classical and modern dramatists, as well as new musical collaborators, are seen in full productions or "gypsy runthroughs."

The School of Art exhibits young artists several times a year, including the Master of Fine Arts exhibition held traditionally near the end of the spring semester in the Blaffer Art Museum. The School of Art also hosts presentations by numerous visiting artists and art historians throughout the academic year.

Housing

UH has several on campus dormitories: Moody Towers, The Quad, Cougar Village I & II, Cougar Place, University Lofts, Bayou Oaks, Cullen Oaks, and Cambridge Oaks.

Moody Towers, frequently just called "Moody," is one of the tallest complexes on campus and the largest area of residence halls. Each of the two towers consists of eighteen stories and together house 1,100 students. The Towers feature a newly renovated dining hall. The rooms in Moody were renovated during the summer of 2011.

The Quad is the newest dorm on campus, having been completed in the Fall of 2020. Named after the former dorms, "The Quadrangle," there are laundry facilities on each floor, as well as a recreational facility, computer lab, and an outdoor courtyard. An extension of The Quad, the Townhouses are single-student dorms right across from The Quad. In total, The Quad and Townhouses combine for 7 buildings that house almost 1,200 students. 

In August 2009, University Lofts—a university-owned and operated residential facility aimed at graduate and professional students—opened and includes retail stores, lecture halls, and recreation facilities.

Cougar Village I & II are a freshman, including first year Honors students, dorm which opened in August 2010 and August 2013, respectively. The dormitory features themed floors with kitchens and lounges, a tutoring center, computer labs, multi-purpose rooms, study areas, a convenience store, a laundry facility, and a fitness center. Cougar Village I & II are exclusive only to freshman and Honors College students.

In addition to traditional dormitories, Cougar Place was an apartment-style housing complex consisting of 400 units. Cougar Place has since been demolished  and has been replaced with a new on-campus housing complex for sophomores. The university has privately owned apartment complexes on campus: Cullen Oaks, Bayou Oaks, and Cambridge Oaks.

In June 2017, a divided panel of the United States Court of Appeals for the Fifth Circuit found that the university did not violate the Constitution's Due Process Clause or Title IX when it expelled both a student for committing a campus sexual assault in a dorm room then abandoning the nude victim in a dorm elevator, as well as his girlfriend, who had recorded the assault and shared the video on social media.

Media
The official student newspaper is The Cougar, formerly The Daily Cougar, and has been published since 1927. Students also produce the Houstonian magazine, which is for graduating students; Cooglife, a monthly lifestyle magazine; and Transitions, a magazine for incoming students.

CoogTV is a live student-run TV network that appears on the University of Houston cable network.

CoogRadio, UH's student-run college radio station, made its debut on August 29, 2011.

Traditions

The seal of the University of Houston, officially adopted in 1938, is a stylized version of the coat-of-arms of General Sam Houston. The first official version was placed on the floor of the Roy Gustav Cullen Building.

UH's official colors are scarlet red and albino white. These were the colors of Sam Houston's ancestor, Sir Hugh de Paduinan, and were adopted by UH at the same time as the official seal. Scarlet red symbolizes courage or inner strength to face the unknown, and white symbolizes the goodness and purity of spirit embodied in helping one's fellow man.

Cougar Red Friday is part of the ongoing Keep Houston Red initiative at the University of Houston. Students and staff are encouraged to wear red shirts on Friday to show pride for the university.

The school's official mascot is a cougar, which was adopted in 1947 and later named Shasta. The university owned a series of female cougars, but this tradition ceased in 1989, upon the death of Shasta V. When a cougar cub was orphaned in Washington State and moved to the Houston Zoo in 2011, the university adopted it as its first live male cougar mascot and he was named Shasta VI.   Shasta VI passed away in August of 2022 from a progressive spinal disease. In November of the same year, the Houston Zoo received two orphaned male cubs from Washington State Fish & Wildlife Services and decided the cubs would carry the long-standing tradition of representing the University of Houston as Shasta VII and Louie.  

The Frontiersmen - initially exclusive to members of the Sigma Chi fraternity, but later opened membership to the entire student body - is a group of students who participate in university events to drive school spirit. At football games, the Frontiersmen—donning cowboy hats, jeans and dusters for attire—run across the field with the university's flag and the Texas flag after each score.

The BLAZE is an oil field warning siren, operated by the Frontiersmen, that was chosen to represent the university's ties to the petroleum industry. The purchase of the siren was completed in 1991. The Sigma Chi Fraternity has overseen the siren and gave it the name "The BLAZE" in honor of its fallen brother, David Blazek.

Frontier Fiesta—a re-creation of a 19th-century Western town, with music, food and historical exhibits—is a major event on campus each spring semester. The student-led festival is a part of a long-standing tradition dating back to the 1940s established by Gan Bey which later became the Sigma Chi Fraternity's Epsilon Xi chapter at UH. Frontier Fiesta attained widespread notoriety when the Sigma Chi variety show performance known as "Bella Union" garnered national attention on the cover of Life magazine as "The Greatest College Show on Earth" and soon-after drew crowds numbered in the tens of thousands from all across the country to participate in the festivities.

Cougar First Impressions—a program headed by the UH Staff Council—takes place every year on the first two days of classes, when faculty and staff turn out to welcome new and returning students.

Weeks of Welcome is another program welcoming students to the university. Over the span of two weeks, departments and student organizations help students learn more about the university with a variety of events.

The Cougar Paw

The Cougar Paw is a popular hand sign used by University of Houston students, faculty, alumni, and athletics fans to represent camaraderie and support. The Cougar Paw tradition was adopted through several athletics events between the University of Houston and the University of Texas.

The University of Houston and the University of Texas played their first football game against one another in 1953. Since this was their first meeting, members of Alpha Phi Omega—the service fraternity in charge of taking care of Shasta I, the university's mascot—brought her to the game. During the trip, Shasta's front paw was caught in the car door and one toe was cut off. At the game, several Longhorn players saw what had happened and began taunting UH players by holding up their hands with the ring finger bent, suggesting the Cougars were invalids. Texas went on to win this game 28–7. UH students had been using the victory sign as a hand signal up to that time but they began using the bent-finger sign as a reminder that they would remember the taunts.

The Cougars did not play the Longhorns again until 1968. With UH fans holding up the new sign of Cougar pride, UH played UT to a 20–20 tie. They didn't meet again until 1976, the first year UH was a member of the Southwest Conference. In front of a record crowd at Texas' Memorial Stadium, UH defeated UT 30–0, a rout that signaled the beginning of the end for legendary Texas coach Darrell Royal. This solidified the use of the Cougar Paw as a tradition.

Athletics

UH's 17-sport intercollegiate program is a member of the American Athletic Conference. Houston was previously a member of Conference USA, of which it was a member from the time the conference was formed in 1995 until 2013. During that time span, the Cougars won 33 C-USA titles. Prior to 1995, Houston was a member of the Southwest Conference.

After 61 years of athletics at UH, other notable achievements include 16 national titles in men's golf, one national title in cross country, six NCAA Men's Basketball Final Four appearances, and two College World Series appearances.

More than 50 Olympic athletes have attended UH, bringing home 33 medals, including 19 gold. Former Olympian and UH alumnus Carl Lewis returned as the men's track and field head coach in 2022. In April 2014, Kelvin Sampson was named the eighth men's basketball head coach. Ronald Hughey is the current women's basketball coach. On January 1, 2019, Dana Holgorsen was named head coach of the Cougar football team.

UH has many recreational sport clubs, including rugby, NCWA wrestling, soccer, tennis, water polo, kendo, and gymnastics.

In addition to varsity sports, the University of Houston offers a variety of intramural sports programs.

Varsity sports

The university has an intercollegiate sports program that competes in the National Collegiate Athletic Association (NCAA). The NCAA's Division I sports at the University of Houston include baseball, basketball, cross country, American football, golf, and track and field for men; basketball, cross country, soccer, softball, swimming and diving, tennis, and track and field for women.

The Houston Cougars football team has made 27 post-season bowl appearances and has to its credit several Southwest Conference championships and Cotton Bowl Classic appearances, as well as the 2006 Conference USA Championship and the 2015 American Athletic Conference championship. The 1989 Heisman Trophy winner, Andre Ware, was a Cougar.

The men's basketball team has made 23 NCAA Tournament appearances, with six trips to the Final Four. See also Phi Slama Jama, the Cougars teams of the early 1980s that featured NBA legends Clyde Drexler and Hakeem Olajuwon.

Houston competes with other notable sports teams, such as the baseball team, which has made 21 NCAA Tournament appearances with two trips to the College World Series; the men's golf team, which has won 16 NCAA National Championships; the women's soccer team, which was rated as the top first-year women's program in the country in 1998; the swimming and diving teams, which have spawned multiple Olympians and All-Americans; the track and field team, which perennially ranks in the top 10 as an NCAA team; and the volleyball team, which had a streak of ten consecutive trips to the NCAA Tournament.

Notable people

Awarding more than 9,000 degrees annually, UH's alumni base exceeds 276,000. The University of Houston has seen many notable persons pass through its halls.

Jack Valenti, long-time president of the Motion Picture Association of America, creator of the MPAA film rating system, and a special assistant in the Lyndon B. Johnson administration, received his B.B.A. from UH.  Artist and filmmaker Julian Schnabel is also an alumnus.

Dwayne Michael Carter Jr., aka Lil Wayne, is a hip-hop artist from New Orleans. He enrolled in 2005 but dropped out shortly after.

Alice Sebold, a novelist known for Lucky and The Lovely Bones, and Matt Mullenweg, creator of WordPress (the most popular, open-source blogging platform), also attended the university.

Notable athletes within the list include NFL players Wilson Whitley, Glenn Montgomery, Alfred Oglesby, Craig Veasey, Donnie Avery, David Klingler, Kevin Kolb, Billy Milner, Sebastian Vollmer, Case Keenum, and Heisman Trophy winner Andre Ware; baseball stars Doug Drabek, Michael Bourn, and Brad Lincoln; golfers Fred Couples, Billy Ray Brown, Steve Elkington, and Fuzzy Zoeller; track and field legends Carl Lewis and Leroy Burrell; NBA basketball players Hakeem "The Dream" Olajuwon, Clyde "The Glide" Drexler and "The Big E" Elvin Hayes as well as Bo Outlaw, Don Chaney, Michael Young, Damon Jones, Carl Herrera and Otis Birdsong; and legendary Dallas Cowboys coach Tom Landry. The owner of the San Diego Padres and noted philanthropist John Moores holds both undergraduate and law degrees. Wade Phillips, a former head coach of the Denver Broncos, Buffalo Bills, and Dallas Cowboys, is a UH alumnus as well.

Elizabeth Warren, a U.S. senator from Massachusetts, a 2020 U.S. presidential candidate, and formerly a Harvard Law School faculty member and chair of the Congressional Oversight Panel created to oversee the U.S. banking bailout during the 2008–2009 financial crisis, received her B.S. from UH in 1970. Tom DeLay, a former member and majority leader of the U.S. House of Representatives, who represented Texas's 22nd congressional district from 1984 until 2006, also attended the University of Houston. Other politicians who attended UH include Gene Green, a Democratic politician and a U.S. congressman from the state of Texas representing that state's 29th congressional district, which includes most of eastern Houston, along with large portions of Houston's eastern suburbs; and Ted Poe, a Republican politician currently representing Texas's 2nd congressional district in the United States House of Representatives. Poe's district includes most of northern Houston, as well as most of the Beaumont–Port Arthur metropolitan area.

Other alumni include Jim Parsons, star of the television series The Big Bang Theory, Brent Spiner of Star Trek: The Next Generation, actors Robert Wuhl, Loretta Devine, Dennis Quaid, Randy Quaid, Brett Cullen, comedian Bill Hicks and former attorney and talk show host Star Jones, Project Runway contestants Chloe Dao and Laura Bennett, sportscasters Jim Nantz and Robert Flores, YouTuber Liza Koshy, singer and rapper Lizzo, and country music stars Larry Gatlin and Kenny Rogers .

Crystle Stewart, Miss USA 2008 is a former student at the university, last attending in 2007. Jason Alkire, an artist and fashion designer, is a graduate as well.

Notable Texas politicians who are graduates of the UH Political Science program include Alfred H. Bennett, U.S. District Judge of the U.S. District Court for the Southern District of Texas; Carol Alvarado, Texas State senator for District 6; James White (Texas politician), State Representative Texas House District 19, Dylan Osborne, Harris County Treasurer; and Odus Evbagharu, Harris County Democratic Party Chair.

Alumni Association
The University of Houston Alumni Association is the official alumni association of the University of Houston. Formed in 1940, it is a nonprofit organization with a Life Membership Program of over 5,000 members. The alumni association is headquartered at the University of Houston's on-campus Athletics/Alumni Center. It can be found on the web at www.houstonalumni.com. It was previously known as the "Ex-Students Association" and the "Houston Alumni Organization."

Notes

References

Reference notes

Further reading

External links

 
 University of Houston Athletics website

 
Houston
University of Houston
Houston
1927 establishments in Texas